Nyagqu or Nyachukha County (Nyagchukha, Nyagquka) or Yajiang County, named after Nyagchukha in Tibetan, is a county of the traditional Kham Region of eastern Tibet. It is currently under the administration of the Garzê Tibetan Autonomous Prefecture, in the west of Sichuan Province, China.

Climate

References  

Populated places in the Garzê Tibetan Autonomous Prefecture
County-level divisions of Sichuan